Ernest Seka Boka (born 22 June 1987) is a Guinean professional footballer who most recently played as a defender for AS Nancy Lorraine.

International career
Seka was born in France to an Ivorian father and Guinean mother. On 23 April 2018, he agreed to represent the Guinea national team.

Seka made his debut for Guinea in a 1–0 2019 Africa Cup of Nations qualification win over Central African Republic on 9 September 2018.

Career statistics

International

References

1987 births
Living people
Sportspeople from Clichy, Hauts-de-Seine
Citizens of Guinea through descent
Guinean footballers
French footballers
Association football defenders
Guinea international footballers
2019 Africa Cup of Nations players
Guinean people of Ivorian descent
French sportspeople of Guinean descent
French sportspeople of Ivorian descent
Ligue 1 players
Ligue 2 players
Championnat National players
Championnat National 2 players
Championnat National 3 players
Entente SSG players
Vendée Poiré-sur-Vie Football players
Amiens SC players
RC Strasbourg Alsace players
AS Nancy Lorraine players
Footballers from Hauts-de-Seine
Black French sportspeople